Clothes Drop is the seventh studio album released by Jamaican singer Shaggy. It was released by Geffen Records on September 2, 2005. When the album was released promotionally in 2004, it was debated that the album would not be commercially released. However, over a year later, the album was officially released.

Critical reception 

Clothes Drop garnered positive reviews from music critics who praised the diverse avenues of dancehall and pop music the tracks go through. At Metacritic, which assigns a normalized rating out of 100 to reviews from mainstream critics, the album received an average score of 61, based on 7 reviews.

Rob Kenner of Vibe gave praise to Shaggy's dynamic vocal delivery and his taste for old-school dancehall in romantic dance tracks and depth-filled social tunes, saying that "Clothesdrop seamlessly blends Shaggy's sharpest pop sensibilities with his (much slept-on) roughneck pedigree." Rolling Stones Christian Hoard felt the album carried an amalgam of tracks ranging from hip-hop-styled and club-oriented to mind-numbingly generic and a bit preachy, saying that "[T]he entire album has a mixed-bag feel, but "Would You Be" shows that his gift for winsome melody and R&B clarity is mostly intact." Dorian Lynskey of The Guardian said that "Clothes Drop is a typically canny and diverse selection: bona fide dancehall cuts interspersed with hooky pop." Entertainment Weeklys David Browne said that despite tracks like "Repent" that better display his talents, he found Shaggy trying to regain his hit-making glory days with middling results, concluding that "Maybe he should lose the monotonous, low-rent beats and banal-hook girls (and boys)." Writing for Blender, Jon Caramanica heavily criticized Shaggy for attempting to showcase his dancehall credentials with a grating voice and without a featured artist to work lyrics off like Rikrok, saying that "Instead, there’s a Black Eyed Pea (“Shut Up and Dance”), a Pussycat Doll (“Supa Hypnotic”) and the palpable sweat of a man trying to figure out what he’s good at, a decade too late."

Track listing

Notes
  signifies additional producer

Sample credits
"Broadway" contains a sample of "Broader than Broadway" as written by Barrington Levy.
"Stand Up" contains a sample of "Stop That Man" as written by Derrick Harriott.
"Shut Up & Dance" contains elements of "Genius of Love" as written by Tom Tom Club.

Credits and personnel
Credits lifted from the liner notes of Clothes Drop.

 

 C. Duck Anderson – Background Vocals
 Alex Cantrall – Producer, Musician
 Chico Chin – Musician
 Armando Colon – Producer, Engineer, Musician
 Heather Cummings – Background Vocals
 J. Curtis – Guitar
 Sly Dunbar – Producer, Musician
 Cliff Feiman – Production Coordination
 Neal Ferrazzani – Assistant
 Michael Fletcher – Producer, Musician
 Chris Gehringer – Mastering
 Brian Gold – Background Vocals
 Tony Gold – Background Vocals
 Tony Green – Musician
 Maurice Gregory – Musician
 Damion Hall – Engineer
 Nellee Hooper – Vocal Producer

 Kameron Houff – Engineer
 A. Kelly – Musician
 Tony Kelly – Producer, Engineer, Musician, Revision
 Martin Kierszenbaum – Keyboards, A&R
 Robert Livingston – Producer, Overdubs, Executive Producer
 Robert Lyn – Musician
 Thom Panunzio – Producer, Mixing
 Shaun "Sting Int'l" Pizzonia – Producer, Engineer, Overdubs, Executive Producer, Mixing, Musician
 Claude "Weakhand" Reynolds – Mixing
 J. Peter Robinson – Art Direction
 Robbie Shakespeare – Producer, Musician
 Fabian Smith – Keyboard Overdubs
 Soulshock – Producer, Engineer, Musician
 Scott Storch – Producer
 Lincoln Thomas – Guitar
 Gita Williams – Product Manager

Charts

References 

2005 albums
Shaggy (musician) albums
Geffen Records albums
Albums produced by Scott Storch